Ostromice  is a village in the administrative district of Gmina Wolin, within Kamień County, West Pomeranian Voivodeship, in north-western Poland.

The village has a population of 490.

References

Ostromice